Algaculture is a form of aquaculture involving the farming of species of algae.

The majority of algae that are intentionally cultivated fall into the category of microalgae (also referred to as phytoplankton, microphytes, or planktonic algae). Macroalgae, commonly known as seaweed, also have many commercial and industrial uses, but due to their size and the specific requirements of the environment in which they need to grow, they do not lend themselves as readily to cultivation (this may change, however, with the advent of newer seaweed cultivators, which are basically algae scrubbers using upflowing air bubbles in small containers).

Commercial and industrial algae cultivation has numerous uses, including production of nutraceuticals such as omega-3 fatty acids (as algal oil) or natural food colorants and dyes, food, fertilizers, bioplastics, chemical feedstock (raw material), protein-rich animal/aquaculture feed, pharmaceuticals, and algal fuel, and can also be used as a means of pollution control and natural carbon sequestration.

Global production of farmed aquatic plants, overwhelmingly dominated by seaweeds, grew in output volume from 13.5 million tonnes in 1995 to just over 30 million tonnes in 2016. Cultured microalgae already contribute to a wide range of sectors in the emerging bioeconomy. Research suggests there are large potentials and benefits of algaculture for the development of a future healthy and sustainable food system.

Uses of algae

Food

Several species of algae are raised for food. While algae have qualities of a sustainable food source, "producing highly digestible proteins, lipids, and carbohydrates, and are rich in essential fatty acids, vitamins, and minerals" and e.g. having a high protein productivity per acre, there are several challenges "between current biomass production and large-scale economic algae production for the food market".

 Micro-algae can be used to create microbial protein used as a powder or in a variety of products.
 Purple laver (Porphyra) is perhaps the most widely domesticated marine algae. In Asia it is used in nori (Japan) and gim (Korea). In Wales, it is used in laverbread, a traditional food, and in Ireland it is collected and made into a jelly by stewing or boiling. Preparation also can involve frying or heating the fronds with a little water and beating with a fork to produce a pinkish jelly. Harvesting also occurs along the west coast of North America, and in Hawaii and New Zealand.
 Algae oil is used as a dietary supplement as the plants also produce Omega-3 (and Omega-6) fatty acids, which are commonly also found in fish oils, and which have been shown to have positive health benefits, including for cognition and against brain aging.
 Dulse (Palmaria palmata) is a red species sold in Ireland and Atlantic Canada. It is eaten raw, fresh, dried, or cooked like spinach.
 Spirulina (Arthrospira platensis) is a blue-green microalgae with a long history as a food source in East Africa and pre-colonial Mexico. Spirulina is high in protein and other nutrients, finding use as a food supplement and for malnutrition. Spirulina thrives in open systems and commercial growers have found it well-suited to cultivation. One of the largest production sites is Lake Texcoco in central Mexico. The plants produce a variety of nutrients and high amounts of protein. Spirulina is often used commercially as a nutritional supplement. 
  Chlorella, another popular microalgae, has similar nutrition to spirulina. Chlorella is very popular in Japan. It is also used as a nutritional supplement with possible effects on metabolic rate.
 Irish moss (Chondrus crispus), often confused with Mastocarpus stellatus, is the source of carrageenan, which is used as a stiffening agent in instant puddings, sauces, and dairy products such as ice cream. Irish moss is also used by beer brewers as a fining agent.
 Sea lettuce (Ulva lactuca), is used in Scotland, where it is added to soups and salads.
 Dabberlocks or badderlocks (Alaria esculenta) is eaten either fresh or cooked in Greenland, Iceland, Scotland and Ireland.
 Aphanizomenon flos-aquae is a cyanobacteria similar to spirulina, which is used as a nutritional supplement.
 Extracts and oils from algae are also used as additives in various food products.
Sargassum species are an important group of seaweeds. These algae have many phlorotannins.
  Cochayuyo (Durvillaea antarctica) is eaten in salads and ceviche in Peru and Chile.
Both microalgae and macroalgae are used to make agar (see below), which is used as a gelling agent in foods.

Lab manipulation
Australian scientists at Flinders University in Adelaide have been experimenting with using marine microalgae to produce proteins for human consumption, creating products like "caviar", vegan burgers, fake meat, jams and other food spreads. By manipulating microalgae in a laboratory, the protein and other nutrient contents could be increased, and flavours changed to make them more palatable. These foods leave a much lighter carbon footprint than other forms of protein, as the microalgae absorb rather than produce carbon dioxide, which contributes to the greenhouse gases.

Fertilizer and agar
For centuries seaweed has been used as fertilizer. It is also an excellent source of potassium for manufacture of potash and potassium nitrate. Also some of microalgae can be used like this.

Both microalgae and macroalgae are used to make agar.

Pollution control
With concern over global warming, new methods for the thorough and efficient capture of CO2 are being sought out. The carbon dioxide that a carbon-fuel burning plant produces can feed into open or closed algae systems, fixing the CO2 and accelerating algae growth. Untreated sewage can supply additional nutrients, thus turning two pollutants into valuable commodities.

Waste high-purity  as well as sequestered carbon from the atmosphere can be used, with potential significant benefits for climate change mitigation.

Algae cultivation is under study for uranium/plutonium sequestration and purifying fertilizer runoff.

Energy production

Business, academia and governments are exploring the possibility of using algae to make gasoline, bio-diesel, biogas and other fuels. Algae itself may be used as a biofuel, and additionally be used to create hydrogen.

Microalgae are also researched for hydrogen production – e.g. micro-droplets for algal cells or synergistic algal-bacterial multicellular spheroid microbial reactors capable of producing oxygen as well as hydrogen via photosynthesis in daylight under air.

Microgeneration

Carbon sequestration

Other uses
Chlorella, particularly a transgenic strain which carries an extra mercury reductase gene, has been studied as an agent for environmental remediation due to its ability to reduce  to the less toxic elemental mercury.

Cultured strains of a common coral microalgal endosymbionts are researched as a potential way to increase corals' thermal tolerance for climate resilience and bleaching tolerance.

Cultured microalgae is used in research and development for potential medical applications, in particular for microbots such as biohybrid microswimmers for targeted drug delivery.

Cultivated algae serve many other purposes, including cosmetics, animal feed, bioplastic production, dyes and colorant production, chemical feedstock production, and pharmaceutical ingredients.

Growing, harvesting, and processing algae

Monoculture

Most growers prefer monocultural production and go to considerable lengths to maintain the purity of their cultures. However, the microbiological contaminants are still under investigation.

With mixed cultures, one species comes to dominate over time and if a non-dominant species is believed to have particular value, it is necessary to obtain pure cultures in order to cultivate this species. Individual species cultures are also much needed for research purposes.

A common method of obtaining pure cultures is serial dilution. Cultivators dilute either a wild sample or a lab sample containing the desired algae with filtered water and introduce small aliquots (measures of this solution) into a large number of small growing containers. Dilution follows a microscopic examination of the source culture that predicts that a few of the growing containers contain a single cell of the desired species. Following a suitable period on a light table, cultivators again use the microscope to identify containers to start larger cultures.

Another approach is to use a special medium which excludes other organisms, including invasive algae.  For example, Dunaliella is a commonly grown genus of microalgae which flourishes in extremely salty water that few other organisms can tolerate.

Alternatively, mixed algae cultures can work well for larval mollusks. First, the cultivator filters the sea water to remove algae which are too large for the larvae to eat. Next, the cultivator adds nutrients and possibly aerates the result. After one or two days in a greenhouse or outdoors, the resulting thin soup of mixed algae is ready for the larvae. An advantage of this method is low maintenance.

Growing algae

Water, carbon dioxide, minerals and light are all important factors in cultivation, and different algae have different requirements. The basic reaction for algae growth in water is carbon dioxide + light energy + water = glucose + oxygen + water.  This is called autotrophic growth.  It is also possible to grow certain types of algae without light, these types of algae consume sugars (such as glucose). This is known as heterotrophic growth.

Temperature
The water must be in a temperature range that will support the specific algal species being grown mostly between 15˚C and 35˚C.

Light and mixing
In a typical algal-cultivation system, such as an open pond, light only penetrates the top  of the water, though this depends on the algae density. As the algae grow and multiply, the culture becomes so dense that it blocks light from reaching deeper into the water. Direct sunlight is too strong for most algae, which can use only about  the amount of light they receive from direct sunlight; however, exposing an algae culture to direct sunlight (rather than shading it) is often the best course for strong growth, as the algae underneath the surface is able to utilize more of the less intense light created from the shade of the algae above.

To use deeper ponds, growers agitate the water, circulating the algae so that it does not remain on the surface. Paddle wheels can stir the water and compressed air coming from the bottom lifts algae from the lower regions. Agitation also helps prevent over-exposure to the sun.

Another means of supplying light is to place the light in the system. Glow plates made from sheets of plastic or glass and placed within the tank offer precise control over light intensity, and distribute it more evenly.  They are seldom used, however, due to high cost.

Odor and oxygen
The odor associated with bogs, swamps, and other stagnant waters can be due to oxygen depletion caused by the decay of deceased algal blooms. Under anoxic conditions, the bacteria inhabiting algae cultures break down the organic material and produce hydrogen sulfide and ammonia, which causes the odor. This hypoxia often results in the death of aquatic animals. In a system where algae is intentionally cultivated, maintained, and harvested, neither eutrophication nor hypoxia are likely to occur.

Some living algae and bacteria also produce odorous chemicals, particularly certain cyanobacteria (previously classed as blue-green algae) such as Anabaena. The most well known of these odor-causing chemicals are MIB (2-methylisoborneol) and geosmin. They give a musty or earthy odor that can be quite strong. Eventual death of the cyanobacteria releases additional gas that is trapped in the cells. These chemicals are detectable at very low levels – in the parts per billion range – and are responsible for many "taste and odor" issues in drinking water treatment and distribution. Cyanobacteria can also produce chemical toxins that have been a problem in drinking water.

Nutrients
Nutrients such as nitrogen (N), phosphorus (P), and potassium (K) serve as fertilizer for algae, and are generally necessary for growth. Silica and iron, as well as several trace elements, may also be considered important marine nutrients as the lack of one can limit the growth of, or productivity in, a given area.  Carbon dioxide is also essential; usually an input of CO2 is required for fast-paced algal growth. These elements must be dissolved into the water, in bio-available forms, for algae to grow.

Methods 
Farming of macroalgae

Open ponds 

Raceway-type ponds and lakes are open to the elements. Open ponds are highly vulnerable to contamination by other microorganisms, such as other algal species or bacteria. Thus cultivators usually choose closed systems for monocultures. Open systems also do not offer control over temperature and lighting. The growing season is largely dependent on location and, aside from tropical areas, is limited to the warmer months.

Open pond systems are cheaper to construct, at the minimum requiring only a trench or pond. Large ponds have the largest production capacities relative to other systems of comparable cost. Also, open pond cultivation can exploit unusual conditions that suit only specific algae. For instance, Dunaliella salina grow in extremely salty water; these unusual media exclude other types of organisms, allowing the growth of pure cultures in open ponds. Open culture can also work if there is a system of harvesting only the desired algae, or if the ponds are frequently re-inoculated before invasive organisms can multiply significantly.  The latter approach is frequently employed by Chlorella farmers, as the growth conditions for Chlorella do not exclude competing algae.

The former approach can be employed in the case of some chain diatoms since they can be filtered from a stream of water flowing through an outflow pipe. A "pillow case" of a fine mesh cloth is tied over the outflow pipe allowing other algae to escape. The chain diatoms are held in the bag and feed shrimp larvae (in Eastern hatcheries) and inoculate new tanks or ponds.

Enclosing a pond with a transparent or translucent barrier effectively turns it into a greenhouse. This solves many of the problems associated with an open system. It allows more species to be grown, it allows the species that are being grown to stay dominant, and it extends the growing season – if heated, the pond can produce year round. Open race way ponds were used for removal of lead using live Spirulina (Arthospira) sp.

Photobioreactors 
Algae can also be grown in a photobioreactor (PBR). A PBR is a bioreactor which incorporates a light source. Virtually any translucent container could be called a PBR; however, the term is more commonly used to define a closed system, as opposed to an open tank or pond.

Because PBR systems are closed, the cultivator must provide all nutrients, including .

A PBR can operate in "batch mode", which involves restocking the reactor after each harvest, but it is also possible to grow and harvest continuously. Continuous operation requires precise control of all elements to prevent immediate collapse. The grower provides sterilized water, nutrients, air, and carbon dioxide at the correct rates. This allows the reactor to operate for long periods. An advantage is that algae that grows in the "log phase" is generally of higher nutrient content than old "senescent" algae. Algal culture is the culturing of algae in ponds or other resources. Maximum productivity occurs when the "exchange rate" (time to exchange one volume of liquid) is equal to the "doubling time" (in mass or volume) of the algae.

PBRs can hold the culture in suspension, or they can provide a substrate on which the culture can form a biofilm. Biofilm-based PBRs have the advantage that they can produce far higher yields for a given water volume, but they can suffer from problems with cells separating from the substrate due to the water flow required to transport gases and nutrients to the culture.

Different types of suspended culture PBRs include:
 Tanks
 Polyethylene sleeves or bags
 Glass or plastic tubes.

Biofilm PBRs include packed bed and porous substrate PBRs. Packed bed PBRs can be different shapes, including flat plate or tubular. In Porous Substrate Bioreactors (PSBRs), the biofilm is exposed directly to the air and receives its water and nutrients by capillary action through the substrate itself. This avoids problems with cells becoming suspended because there is no water flow across the biofilm surface. The culture could become contaminated by airborne organisms, but defending against other organisms is one of the functions of a biofilm.

Harvesting
Algae can be harvested using microscreens, by centrifugation, by flocculation and by froth flotation.

Interrupting the carbon dioxide supply can cause algae to flocculate on its own, which is called "autoflocculation".

"Chitosan", a commercial flocculant, more commonly used for water purification, is far more expensive. The powdered shells of crustaceans are processed to acquire chitin, a polysaccharide found in the shells, from which chitosan is derived via deacetylation. Water that is more brackish, or saline requires larger amounts of flocculant. Flocculation is often too expensive for large operations.

Alum and ferric chloride are other chemical flocculants.

In froth flotation, the cultivator aerates the water into a froth, and then skims the algae from the top.

Ultrasound and other harvesting methods are currently under development.

Oil extraction

Algae oils have a variety of commercial and industrial uses, and are extracted through a  variety of methods. Estimates of the cost to extract oil from microalgae vary, but are likely to be around three times higher than that of extracting palm oil.

Physical extraction
In the first step of extraction, the oil must be separated from the rest of the algae. The simplest method is mechanical crushing. When algae is dried it retains its oil content, which then can be "pressed" out with an oil press. Different strains of algae warrant different methods of oil pressing, including the use of screw, expeller and piston. Many commercial manufacturers of vegetable oil use a combination of mechanical pressing and chemical solvents in extracting oil. This use is often also adopted for algal oil extraction.

Osmotic shock is a sudden reduction in osmotic pressure, this can cause cells in a solution to rupture. Osmotic shock is sometimes used to release cellular components, such as oil.

Ultrasonic extraction, a branch of sonochemistry, can greatly accelerate extraction processes. Using an ultrasonic reactor, ultrasonic waves are used to create cavitation bubbles in a solvent material.  When these bubbles collapse near the cell walls, the resulting shock waves and liquid jets cause those cells walls to break and release their contents into a solvent.  Ultrasonication can enhance basic enzymatic extraction.

Chemical extraction
Chemical solvents are often used in the extraction of the oils.  The downside to using solvents for oil extraction are the dangers involved in working with the chemicals. Care must be taken to avoid exposure to vapors and skin contact, either of which can cause serious health damage. Chemical solvents also present an explosion hazard.

A common choice of chemical solvent is hexane, which is widely used in the food industry and is relatively inexpensive. Benzene and ether can also separate oil.  Benzene is classified as a carcinogen.

Another method of chemical solvent extraction is Soxhlet extraction.  In this method, oils from the algae are extracted through repeated washing, or percolation, with an organic solvent such as hexane or petroleum ether, under reflux in a special glassware.  The value of this technique is that the solvent is reused for each cycle.

Enzymatic extraction uses enzymes to degrade the cell walls with water acting as the solvent. This makes fractionation of the oil much easier. The costs of this extraction process are estimated to be much greater than hexane extraction.

Supercritical CO2 can also be used as a solvent.  In this method, CO2 is liquefied under pressure and heated to the point that it becomes supercritical (having properties of both a liquid and a gas), allowing it to act as a solvent.

Other methods are still being developed, including ones to extract specific types of oils, such as those with a high production of long-chain highly unsaturated fatty acids.

Algal culture collections
Specific algal strains can be acquired from algal culture collections, with over 500 culture collections registered with the World Federation for Culture Collections.

See also

Sources

References

External links
 
 
 
 
 www.sas.org How to Rear a Plankton Menagerie (home grow micro algae in soda bottles)
 io.uwinnipeg.ca breeding algae in batch and continuous flow systems on small scale
 Making Algae Grow 
 www.unu.edu Indian experience with algal ponds
 Blog Posts | gerd-kloeck-141049 | Renewable Energy World List of companies involved in microalgae production.
 Photobioreactors : Scale-up and optimisation PhD thesis Wageningen UR.
 Research on algae within Wageningen UR
 Photobioreactor using polyethylene and chicken wire .
 Instructables.com - Simple Home Algae Culture and Breeding
 Microphyt - Microalgae Production and Photobioreactor Design